Victoria Rooms may refer to:

Victoria Rooms, Bristol, home of the University of Bristol's music department 
Victoria Rooms, heroine of the musical Follow That Girl